Cowboy G-Men is an American Western series that aired in syndication from September 1952 to June 1953, for a total of thirty-nine episodes.

Synopsis
Russell Hayden and Jackie Coogan star as Pat Gallagher and Stoney Crockett, a pair of government agents operating in the American West in the 1870s. Phil Arnold portrayed Zerbo, a sometimes associate of Gallagher and Crockett. Gallagher typically was undercover as a ranch hand, while Crockett took the role of a wrangler.

Cowboy G-Men was based on a story by Henry B. Donovan and featured the writing of such western fiction authors as Todhunter Ballard.

Unusually for its time, the series was filmed in color; however, it appears that only black-and-white prints have ever been aired on television.

Episode list

Release

Home media 
Timeless Media Group released a 10 episode best-of set on DVD in Region 1 on October 26, 2008.

Alpha Home Entertainment has released collections of Cowboy G-Men episodes on DVD.  Each volume contains 4 episodes from the series. Six DVDs have been published from 2006 to 2011.

International 
In Japan, Cowboy G-Men was the first show to be dubbed in Japanese in 1956. The late veteran voice actor Junpei Takiguchi voiced all the characters including the female characters.

References

External links
 

1952 American television series debuts
1953 American television series endings
Television series set in the 1870s
Black-and-white American television shows
English-language television shows
First-run syndicated television programs in the United States
Television series by CBS Studios
1950s Western (genre) television series